Iris caucasica (also known as Caucasian iris) is a species of plant in the genus Iris, it is also in the subgenus of Scorpiris. Pronounced as 'kaw-KAS-ee-kuh'.

It is a bulbous perennial

It was described in 'Commentat. Soc. Phys.' to Caesareae Universitatis Mosquensis of 1808 by Georg Hoffman.

It was once confused with iris orchioides, but iris caucasica is a smaller plant, with sessile flowers. Also it has leaves that have white margins.

Iris caucasica is an accepted name by the RHS.

Habit
It has a brown ovoid bulb with fleshy roots. It is similar in form to Iris persica.

It has grey green leaves, which are ciliate and that start growing at flowering time. They reach up to 10–12 cm long and l-2 cm wide. The leaves have a faint white margin.

It has between 1–4 flowers per stem, normally pale yellow or green and with winged falls. The falls also have a yellow ridge. The flowers are 5–15 cm (2–6 in) across. It flowers in late spring. It eventually reaches a height of 15 cm (flower and stem). The flowers are not fragrant.

Native
Iris caucasica grows on limestone mountain slopes (at 1200-3500m above sea level) in Turkey and Armenia and Azerbaijan, in the Caucasus mountains. Bieberstein notes seeing it near Tbilisi in the South Caucasus.
It has also been found in Israel and Iran.

Hybrids
In 1892, Michael Foster introduced a hybrid version Iris Caucasica 'Kharput'. Which does not have winged falls. It still has 4–5 flowers per stem, which are greenish-yellow. But they are generally larger than parent plant.

Uses
Iris caucasica (or Sarı nevroz, a local name of Ovacık, Dersim) has been used a folk medicinal plant in Turkey. The flowers have been used in an infusion to treat colds.

References

Sources
Czerepanov, S. K. 1995. Vascular plants of Russia and adjacent states (the former USSR). (L USSR) [noted as 'Juno caucasica' (Hoffm.) Klatt]. 
Davis, P. H., ed. 1965–1988. Flora of Turkey and the east Aegean islands. (F Turk) 
Komarov, V. L. et al., eds. 1934–1964. Flora SSSR. (F USSR) 
Mathew, B. 1981. The Iris. (Iris) 146. 
Rechinger, K. H., ed. 1963–. Flora iranica. (F Iran) 
Townsend, C. C. & E. Guest. 1966–. Flora of Iraq. (F Iraq)

External links
 image of iris causica
 Another image and growing tips

caucasica
Plants described in 1808
Flora of Turkey
Flora of Armenia
Flora of Azerbaijan
Flora of the Caucasus
Flora of Israel
Flora of Palestine (region)